Walter Schoel Engineering Co. located in Birmingham, Alabama, has offered consulting civil engineering, hydrologic and environmental consulting, and land surveying services, since its founding by Herman Schoel in 1888. The company is a member of the Alabama Engineering Hall of Fame.

References

Companies based in Birmingham, Alabama
Consulting firms established in 1888
Engineering consulting firms of the United States
1888 establishments in Alabama